The Liberty School Cafeteria is a historic school building in rural Faulkner County, Arkansas. It is a modest single-story wood-frame structure, with a gabled roof that has exposed rafter ends in the American craftsman style. It was built in 1935 with funding support from the Works Progress Administration, and originally housed classrooms for science, agriculture and math, as part of a consolidated regional primary school. In the 1940s it was converted into a cafeteria. The school district was further consolidated with Vilonia in the 1950s and 1960s, when this building's school function ceased. The grounds are now used for a flea market.

The building was listed on the National Register of Historic Places in 1992.

See also
National Register of Historic Places listings in Faulkner County, Arkansas

References

School buildings on the National Register of Historic Places in Arkansas
Buildings and structures in Faulkner County, Arkansas